"English Civil War" (often subtitled "Johnny Comes Marching Home") is a song by English punk rock band the Clash, featured on their second album Give 'Em Enough Rope, and released as a single on 23 February 1979. It reached number 25 in the UK Singles Chart and number 29 in the Irish Singles Chart.

Background
The song is derived from an American Civil War song, "When Johnny Comes Marching Home", written by Irish-born Massachusetts Unionist Patrick Sarsfield Gilmore. It was popular among both sides of the conflict.

Having learnt the song at school, Joe Strummer suggested that the band should update it. Those on the left wing saw the rise during the mid-1970s of far right groups such as the National Front as alarming and dangerous omens for Britain's future. The song is about this state of politics in the country and warns against all things uniformed and sinister. Shortly after the song had its first live performance at a Rock Against Racism concert, Strummer said, echoing the song's lyrics, in an interview to the music newspaper Record Mirror:

The cover of the single is a still from John Halas and Joy Batchelor's 1954 animated adaptation of George Orwell's dystopian novella Animal Farm.

Track listing
 7" vinyl
 "English Civil War (Johnny Comes Marching Home)" (Trad. Arr. Joe Strummer/Mick Jones) – 2:38
 "Pressure Drop" (Toots Hibbert) – 3:25

Personnel

"English Civil War"
 Joe Strummer – lead vocals, rhythm guitars
 Mick Jones – backing vocals, lead guitars
 Paul Simonon – bass guitar
 Topper Headon – drums

"Pressure Drop"
 Joe Strummer – lead vocal, piano, rhythm guitar
 Mick Jones – backing vocals, rhythm guitar, lead guitars
 Paul Simonon – backing vocal, bass guitar
 Topper Headon – drums

Charts

Cover versions
The Levellers included a cover of the song on their 1994 EP, Julie.

References

External links 
 Patriotic Melodies: When Johnny comes Marching Home (US Library of Congress)

1978 singles
The Clash songs
Song recordings produced by Sandy Pearlman
Songs against racism and xenophobia
Year of song unknown
Songs about England
Anti-fascist music
CBS Records singles